Eptagoneia or Eftagoneia (Εφταγώνεια) is a village in the Limassol District of Cyprus, located 4 km north of Kellaki. 

Also it is located 28 km from Limassol town.

Eptagoneia is at the foot of Papoutsa and belongs to the Pitsilia geographic area and lies in a semi-mountainous area. It is near Arakapas, Kellaki, Akapnou some Limassol's villages and near Melini and Ora villages that belongs in the Larnaca district.

Etymology 
The name of the village is a compound word which consists of two words in Greek;  "epta" (επτά: meaning seven)" and "goneia" (γωνιά: meaning corner). There are two versions as to how the village got its name: 

 The formation of the territory of the region is characterized by many corners.
 The village had seven neighborhoods in the past.

References

Communities in Limassol District